Robin Kern (born 3 October 1993) is a German professional tennis player. He reached his career-high singles ranking of world No. 350 in October 2013.

Career

Kern made his ATP World Tour debut in 2011, when he was given a wild card into the main draw of the 2011 MercedesCup. There, he lost in the first round to Fabio Fognini in straight sets.
In 2012, Kern was again awarded a wild card into the main draw of the MercedesCup, where he lost to Thomaz Bellucci in the first round. In 2013, he received a wild card into the MercedesCup for the third consecutive time, losing to German qualifier Nils Langer 6–3, 4–6, 3–6 in the first round.

Junior Grand Slam finals

Doubles: 1 (1 title)

ATP Challenger and ITF Futures finals

Singles: 16 (10–6)

Doubles: 9 (8–1)

References

External links
 
 

1993 births
Living people
German male tennis players
Sportspeople from Nuremberg
US Open (tennis) junior champions
Grand Slam (tennis) champions in boys' doubles
Tennis people from Bavaria
20th-century German people
21st-century German people